Cheshire County Cricket Club is one of twenty minor county clubs within the domestic cricket structure of England and Wales. It represents the historic county of Cheshire.

The team is currently a member of the Minor Counties Championship Western Division and plays in the MCCA Knockout Trophy. Cheshire played List A matches occasionally until 2004 but is not classified as a List A team per se. The club does not have a base but plays matches around the county including at Chester Boughton Hall, Didsbury, Nantwich, New Brighton, Grappenhall, Tattenhall and at Moss Lane, Alderley Edge.

Honours
 Minor Counties Championship (5) - 1967, 1985, 1988, 2007, 2013; shared (2) - 2001, 2005, 2013
 MCCA Knockout Trophy (4) - 1983, 1987, 1996, 2018
 MCCA T20 Cup (1) - 2015

Earliest cricket
Cricket may not have reached Cheshire until the 18th century. As advised by the Association of Cricket Statisticians (ACS), the earliest known reference to the sport being played in the county has been found in the Manchester Journal dated Saturday, 1 September 1781. It concerned an eleven-a-side match played the previous Monday, 27 August, at Brinnington Moor between a team of printers and one representing the villages of Haughton and Bredbury, who were the winners. As Haughton was then in Lancashire, the match is the earliest reference for that county too.

Origin of club
According to Wisden there was a county organisation as early as 1819. The present club was founded on 29 September 1908 and entered the Minor Counties Championship for the first time the following year, 1909.

Club history
Cheshire played its first List A match against Surrey on 6 May 1964, in the first round of the Gillette Cup at the Ellerman Lines Cricket Ground, Hoylake.
Cheshire has won the Minor Counties Championship five times, and twice shared the title. It won the title outright in 1967, 1985, 1988, 2007 and 2013. It shared the accolade in 2001 with Lincolnshire and in 2005 with Suffolk.

Cheshire has won the MCCA Knockout Trophy three times since its inception in 1983. It won in 1983, 1987 and 1996.

Cheshire won the MCCA T20 Cup in 2015, the first season in which it was held. The tournament was dropped for 2016.

Current squad

 Warren Goodwin
 Calum Rowe
 Rick Moore (c)
 Danny Leech (c)
 Rob Jones
 Danny Lamb
 Will Owen
 Ryan Brown
 Jack Williams
 Ash Davis
 Danny Woods

Notable players
The following Cheshire cricketers also made an impact on the first-class game:

 David Bailey
 Bob Barber
 Winston Benjamin
 Bob Cooke
 Geoff Miller
 Mudassar Nazar
 Chris Schofield
 Barry Wood

The following Cheshire cricketers are famous for non-cricketing reasons.

 Stuart Cummings (MBE): ex-Rugby League referee

Further reading
 Rowland Bowen, Cricket: A History of its Growth and Development, Eyre & Spottiswoode, 1970
 E W Swanton (editor), Barclays World of Cricket, Guild, 1986
 Playfair Cricket Annual – various editions
 Wisden Cricketers' Almanack – various editions

References

External links

 
National Counties cricket
History of Cheshire
Cricket clubs established in 1908
Cricket in Cheshire
1908 establishments in England